In linear algebra, a Block LU decomposition is a matrix decomposition of a block matrix into a lower block triangular matrix L and an upper block triangular matrix U. This decomposition is used in numerical analysis to reduce the complexity of the block matrix formula.

Block LDU decomposition

Block Cholesky decomposition
Consider a block matrix:

where the matrix  is assumed to be non-singular,

We can also rewrite the above equation using the half matrices:

where the Schur complement of 
in the block matrix is defined by
 
and the half matrices can be calculated by means of Cholesky decomposition or LDL decomposition.
The half matrices satisfy that

Thus, we have

where

The matrix  can be decomposed in an algebraic manner into

See also
Matrix decomposition

Matrix decompositions